Amalgamated Bank is a union-owned bank headquartered in New York City. It may also refer to:
 Amalgamated Bank of Chicago, a former sister institution to the Amalgamated Bank
 Amalgamated Bank Limited, more commonly known as AmalBank
 Absa Group Limited, formerly named Amalgamated Banks of South Africa